Julian Okwara (born December 27, 1997) is an English born Nigerian gridiron football defensive end for the Detroit Lions of the National Football League (NFL). He played college football at Notre Dame and was drafted by the Lions in the third round of the 2020 NFL Draft.

Early years
Okwara was born in London while his mother was visiting family, but raised in Nigeria. Okwara lived in Lagos and was raised in Lekki before moving to the United States when he was in the third grade. He attended Ardrey Kell High School in Charlotte, North Carolina. He committed to the University of Notre Dame to play college football.

College career
As a true freshman at Notre Dame in 2016, he played in 11 games, recording four tackles. As a sophomore in 2017, he played in 12 of 13 games, recording 17 tackles, 2.5 sacks and an interception. As a junior in 2018, he started 12 of 13 games, finishing with 38 tackles and eight sacks. Okwara returned to Notre Dame for his senior season in 2019.

Professional career

The Detroit Lions selected Okwara in the third round with the 67th overall pick of the 2020 NFL Draft. On June 9, 2020, the Lions signed Okwara to a four-year contract. He was placed on injured reserve on October 21, 2020, after suffering a right leg injury in Week 6. On December 22, 2020, Okwara was activated off of injured reserve.

On December 3, 2022, Okwara was placed on injured reserve.

Personal life
Okwara's older brother, Romeo Okwara, also played college football at Notre Dame and also currently plays in the NFL for the Detroit Lions.

References

External links
Notre Dame Fighting Irish bio

1997 births
Living people
Sportspeople from London
American football defensive ends
Nigerian players of American football
Players of American football from Charlotte, North Carolina
Notre Dame Fighting Irish football players
Detroit Lions players
American sportspeople of Nigerian descent
English people of Nigerian descent
English emigrants to the United States